Rand Evett (born March 1, 1954) is an American former professional tennis player.

Evett, the son of a Yale physics instructor, was raised in Tucson, Arizona, where he attended Catalina High School. 

During the early 1970s he played collegiate tennis for the University of Arizona and won back to back WAC singles championships in 1972 and 1973. He also earned NCAA All-American honors in 1973 and 1974. In 1974 he and De Armond Briggs won the doubles title at the national amateur grass‐court championships.

On the professional tour, Evett reached a best world ranking of 219, making singles main draw appearances at the Australian Open and Wimbledon. He had a win over world number 33 Shlomo Glickstein in Tel Aviv in 1983. As a doubles player he was ranked in the world's top 100 and reached the round of 16 at the 1983 US Open.

ATP Challenger finals

Doubles: 1 (0–1)

References

External links
 
 

1954 births
Living people
American male tennis players
Arizona Wildcats men's tennis players
Tennis people from Arizona
Sportspeople from Tucson, Arizona